American Poet is an album of an early solo concert by American rock musician Lou Reed, recorded live at the Calderone Concert Hall, Hempstead, New York, on Boxing Day 1972 during the Transformer tour. The backing band are the Tots. It features material from The Velvet Underground's first album, The Velvet Underground & Nico, and Reed's first two 1972 solo albums, debut Lou Reed and Transformer. The version of "Berlin" is the arrangement from that debut album. American Poet was released in 2001. It had previously been released as a bootleg recording.

The album's cover photo is by Mick Rock, from the same photo shoot as the Transformer cover.

Track listing
All tracks composed by Lou Reed

 "White Light/White Heat" (4:04)
 "Vicious" (3:06)
 "I'm Waiting for the Man" (7:14)
 "Walk It Talk It" (4:04)
 "Sweet Jane" (4:38)
 "Interview" (5:01) Remote broadcast from Ultra Sonic Recording Studios for Tuesday Night Concert series WLIR-FM
 "Heroin" (8:34)
 "Satellite of Love" (3:28)
 "Walk on the Wild Side" (5:55)
 "I'm So Free" (3:52)
 "Berlin" (6:00)
 "Rock & Roll" (5:13)

Personnel
 Lou Reed – lead vocals and rhythm guitar

The Tots
 Vinny Laporta – guitar
 Eddie Reynolds – guitar, backing vocals
 Bobby Resigno – bass guitar
 Scottie Clark – drums

References

Lou Reed live albums
2001 live albums
Albums with cover art by Mick Rock